not to be confused with Chirton Hall, Northumberland
Churton Hall is a country house in the parish of Churton, Cheshire, England.  The date of building is uncertain. There is a loose board carrying the date 1569 that, according to the authors of the Buildings of England series, may or may not date the house.  It is a half-timbered house built for the Barnston family, and was "heavily restored" in 1978–80.  Much of the timber framing has been replaced by brick at the rear of the house.  The house is roofed in slate.  It has two storeys, and its plan is E-shaped.  At each end of the building are gables with different designs.  The house is recorded in the National Heritage List for England as a designated Grade II listed building.

See also

Listed buildings in Churton by Farndon

References

Country houses in Cheshire
Timber framed buildings in Cheshire
Grade II listed houses in Cheshire